The Chinese Gold Panda is a series of gold bullion coins issued by the People's Republic of China. The Official Mint of the People's Republic of China introduced the panda gold bullion coins in 1982.

There is also a Silver Panda series issued with the same designs as the Gold Panda coins.

History 

Beginning in 1983 another size was added – . Larger panda coins were issued in some years, weighing . These popular coins are issued in prooflike brilliant uncirculated quality with a different design each year. A freeze of the design was announced with the 2001 issues—and thus the 2002 pandas were identical to 2001. But collectors spoke up in behalf of annual changes, and China reverted to their original policy. There are several mints that produce these coins, including but not limited to: Beijing, Shanghai, Shenyang and Shenzhen. Unlike coins made by U.S. branch mints that carry mintmarks to identify their origin, Chinese mints usually do not employ them. In certain years there are minor variations—in the size of the date, style of the temple, etc.—in the coin design that allow the originating mint to be determined. Certain years are also designed by different designers. The design of the obverse changes less frequently than the design of the panda change. The official Chinese panda coins should not be confused with Chinese medals that also use a panda.

Description
Obverse:
Depiction of the Temple of Heaven in the center with Chinese characters on top saying "Zhonghua Renmin Gongheguo" meaning People's Republic of China and the bottom the year of issue. If the issue is a commemorative issue, the theme will be marked here also.

Reverse:
Different portraits of panda that changes every year (except for 2001 and 2002, which share the same design).

The official distributor for the Gold and Silver Panda coins in China is the China Gold Coin Corporation (CGCC); in the United States, Panda America has been an official distributor since 1982.

Denominations 
The Gold Pandas are legal tender in the People's Republic of China and are currently issued in face value denominations of 500, 200, 100, 50 and 20 yuan; from 1982 through 2000 they were issued in denominations of 100, 50, 25, and 10 yuan with the 5 yuan added in 1983. An exception was 1991, when 1-gram Gold Pandas were minted, issued in the denomination of 3 yuan. 2015 was the only year that the Gold Panda did not have any denomination imprinted on the coin.

Revised weights
Starting in 2016, the weight system of troy ounces was replaced by the metric system of grams, the standard system of weights used in the People’s Republic of China. This change may affect bullion buyers, who calculate their holdings in ounces, more than coin collectors who collect by denomination.

See also
American Gold Eagle
Bullion
Bullion coin
Gold as an investment
Inflation hedge
Platinum as an investment
Silver as an investment

References

External links
 Website of the China Gold Coin Corporation, official distributor of the Chinese panda coins in China.

Giant pandas
Bullion coins of China
Gold bullion coins